A total solar eclipse occurred on July 9, 1945. A solar eclipse occurs when the Moon passes between Earth and the Sun, thereby totally or partly obscuring the image of the Sun for a viewer on Earth. A total solar eclipse occurs when the Moon's apparent diameter is larger than the Sun's, blocking all direct sunlight, turning day into darkness. Totality occurs in a narrow path across Earth's surface, with the partial solar eclipse visible over a surrounding region thousands of kilometres wide.
The path of totality crossed northern North America, across Greenland and into Scandinavia, the western Soviet Union, and central Asia.

Related eclipses

Solar eclipses 1942–1946

Saros 145

Notes

References

 

1945 07 09
1945 in science
1945 07 09
July 1945 events